In a synthetic environment, the synthetic human-made environment (SHME) is the representation (i.e. modeling) of buildings, bridges, roads, and other man-made structures.

See also
 Glossary of military modeling and simulation

Further reading
 Braudaway, Wesley Ph.D., "Chapter 3 Synthetic Natural Environments Representation", University of Central Florida,  
 Sheldon, Beth, "M&S Quiz ANSWERS: Synthetic Natural Environment", SISO, 1999 
 "Department of Defense Modeling and Simulation (M&S) Master Plan", DoD 5000.59-P, DoD, 1995  Note: See Cultural Features term.

 
Synthetic environment